Notable novelists who specialise or specialised in writing romance novels include:

A

B

C

D

E

F

G

H

I

J

K

L

M

N

O

P

Q

R

S

T

V

W

X-Z

See also
 Lists of writers

Notes

References

 
Romantic novelists